See also Sangha (disambiguation).
Sangha  is a department or commune of Koulpélogo Province in eastern Burkina Faso. Its capital is the town of Sangha. According to the 2019 census the department has a total population of 54,623.

Towns and villages
 Sangha (8,536 inhabitants) (capital)
 Biguimnoghin (651 inhabitants) 
 Dabodin (633 inhabitants) 
 Daboulga (700 inhabitants) 
 Dagomkom (1,828 inhabitants) 
 Diougo (1,435 inhabitants) 
 Ganzaga (636 inhabitants) 
 Goghin, Koulpélogo (1,030 inhabitants) 
 Gouadiga (1,028 inhabitants) 
 Idani (7,000 inhabitants) 
 Kandoure (515 inhabitants) 
 Kaongo (1,095 inhabitants) 
 Kombilga (2,783 inhabitants) 
 Koyenga (1,078 inhabitants) 
 Longo (2,546 inhabitants) 
 Naba-Dabogo (2,516 inhabitants) 
 Ouedogo (1,293 inhabitants) 
 Sangha-Peulh (1,408 inhabitants) 
 Sangha-Yarcé (1,446 inhabitants) 
 Sankanse (1,104 inhabitants) 
 Tabe (1,343 inhabitants) 
 Tampaologo (665 inhabitants) 
 Tankoaga (2,864 inhabitants) 
 Taram-Noaga (4,511 inhabitants) 
 Yourga (1,296 inhabitants) 
 Yourkoudghin (982 inhabitants)

References

Departments of Burkina Faso
Koulpélogo Province